Montez Robinson is an American college basketball coach, currently serving as the Head Coach of Fort Valley State Basketball. He previously served as the interm. Head Coach of UT Martin Basketball.

Playing career
Robinson started his college career at Kemper Military, where he was a two-year starter and captain. He completed his playing career at North Georgia.

Coaching career
After graduation, Robinson started his coaching career at Truett McConnell, before joining Tony Ingle's staff at Kennesaw State, where he stayed until 2011. After five years on the staff of Bethune-Cookman, Robinson was named head coach at Alcorn State, taking over for Luther Riley.

In his first season with the Braves, Robinson guided the team from a ninth-place finish the seasons before to a second-place finish and 15–15 overall record. In 2016–17, Robinson was named SWAC Coach of the Year after another second-place finish for the Braves, and an 18–14 overall record.

In March 2020, director of athletics Derek Horne announced that the school would not renew Robinson's contract, ending his five-year tenure at Alcorn State.

On September 11, 2020, Stewart was hired by UT Martin as an assistant coach under Anthony Stewart. On November 17, two days after the sudden death of Stewart, Robinson was named the interim head coach of the Skyhawks for the 2020–21 season.

Head coaching record

References

Year of birth missing (living people)
Living people
Alcorn State Braves basketball coaches
American men's basketball coaches
Basketball coaches from Alabama
Basketball players from Alabama
Bethune–Cookman Wildcats men's basketball coaches
Kennesaw State Owls men's basketball coaches
North Georgia Nighthawks men's basketball players
People from Fairfield, Alabama
Truett McConnell Bears men's basketball coaches
UT Martin Skyhawks men's basketball coaches